Vanderpool is a surname. Notable people with the surname include:
Alex Vanderpool, Bahamian footballer
Arianna Vanderpool-Wallace (born 1990), Bahamian swimmer
Clare Vanderpool (born 1965), American writer
Daniel Vanderpool (1891–1988), American Nazarene minister
Daven "Prestige" Vanderpool, American musician and record producer
Fitz Vanderpool (born 1967), Canadian boxer
Jennifer Vanderpool American artist
Syd Vanderpool (born 1972), Canadian boxer, brother of Fitz
Vincent Vanderpool Wallace, Bahamian footballer

See also
Vanderpool, codename for x86 virtualization
Vander Pool, American Thoroughbred racehorse
Vanderpool, Texas, unincorporated community in the United States
Vanderpool Farm Complex, historic house in Albany County, New York, United States